These are the official results of the Men's Javelin Throw event at the 1996 Summer Olympics in Atlanta, Georgia. There were 34 competitors, of which 12 qualified for the final. The qualification mark was set at 83.00 metres.

Medalists

Schedule
All times are Eastern Time Zone (UTC-5)

Abbreviations
All results shown are in metres

Records

Qualification

Group A

Group B

Final

See also
 1993 Men's World Championships Javelin Throw (Stuttgart)
 1994 Men's European Championships Javelin Throw (Stuttgart)
 1995 Men's World Championships Javelin Throw (Gothenburg)
 1996 Javelin Throw Year Ranking
 1997 Men's World Championships Javelin Throw (Athens)
 1998 Men's European Championships Javelin Throw (Budapest)
 1999 Men's World Championships Javelin Throw (Seville)

References

External links
 Official Report
 Results
 koti.welho

J
Javelin throw at the Olympics
Men's events at the 1996 Summer Olympics